Peter Zander (9 July 1922 – 18 January 2019) was a German-born British actor. Zander was born in July 1922 in Berlin, but emigrated to England in 1933 with his parents. He died in January 2019 in a care home, after succumbing to the effects of a stroke suffered in 2012.

Filmography

References

External links
 

1922 births
2019 deaths
20th-century British male actors
British male film actors
British male television actors
German emigrants to the United Kingdom